Fogelsville is a village in Lehigh County, Pennsylvania.  It is a suburb of Allentown, in Upper Macungie Township, and is part of the Lehigh Valley, which has a population of 861,899 and was the 68th most populous metropolitan area in the U.S. as of the 2020 census.

Fogelsville is named after Judge John Fogel, who built the first building in the area, a hotel, in 1798. The village surrounds a number of large industrial parks and corporate centers.  The town is known as a large regional trucking hub. Major roads servicing Fogelsville include Interstate 78 and Pennsylvania Route 100. These two roads intersect in a cloverleaf, which is one of the busiest in the western Lehigh Valley.

While the village of Fogelsville can be found at ZIP Code 18051, immediately surrounding areas to the east and south use the Allentown ZIP code of 18106 or the Breinigsville ZIP code of 18031, respectively.  Downtown is located at approximately 40° 34′ 59.45″ N, 75° 37′ 57.37″ W. The 1990 census reported a population of 900, although a more recent estimate places the population at approximately 3200.

Industry and education
Fogelsville was once the terminus of the Catasauqua and Fogelsville Railroad  (later extended to Rittenhouse Gap) and the site of extensive iron ore mining to supply the Lehigh Valley's iron furnaces.

Penn State Lehigh Valley, a satellite campus of Penn State University, was also located in Fogelsville prior to its 2009 move to Center Valley. 

One of the four Yocco's Hot Dogs restaurants, the Lehigh Valley-based fast food establishment known nationally for their hot dogs and cheesesteaks, is located in Fogelsville, on Pennsylvania Route 100.

References

1798 establishments in Pennsylvania
Populated places established in 1798
Unincorporated communities in Lehigh County, Pennsylvania
Unincorporated communities in Pennsylvania